Discursive is an adjective from the word discourse and may refer specifically to:
 Discursive complex, a methodological device in psychoanalysis
 Discursive democracy, any system of political decisions based on some tradeoff of consensus decision making and representative democracy
 Discursive meditation, in Christian prayer
 Discursive psychology, a school of psychology
 Discursive reasoning
 Discursive repetition, or Repetition (rhetorical device), the repetition of a certain type of discourse in linguistics